Marine Policy is a monthly interdisciplinary peer-reviewed academic journal published by Elsevier concerning ocean policy studies, analyzing social science disciplines relevant to the formulation of marine policy. It was established in 1977 by founding editor Tony Loftas. The current editor-in-chief is Q. Hanich (University of Wollongong).

Abstracting and indexing 
According to the Journal Citation Reports, the journal has a 2014 impact factor of 2.610, ranking it 4th out of 85 journals in the category "International Relations".

See also 
 List of international relations journals

References

External links 
 

Elsevier academic journals
English-language journals
International relations journals
Monthly journals
Publications established in 1977